The Mark 21 Mod 2 torpedo, was a passive acoustic homing variant of the Mark 13 torpedo. It used the widely used Mark 13 torpedo as a basis, with the addition of passive acoustic homing developed by Bell Labs. 

The intended purpose for this torpedo went through a series of changes. Although first considered as a free-dropped weapon from aircraft, as for the Mark 13, Project Kingfisher in August 1944 set out to develop stand-off weapons which could be launched from outside the defensive range of target capital ships. It was recognized that US ships in the Pacific at this period were now heavily defended by AA, making attacks against them too costly to be successful. Once the attacks against the Japanese home islands began, a similar challenge would be faced by the US Navy and so a weapon to defeat it would be needed. Soon after Kingfisher, the Japanese began their kamikaze attacks as a more drastic approach to the same problem.

Kingfisher A was an interim project for an unpowered glide bomb, carrying a homing torpedo.

Kingfisher C was a more developed version, carried by a powered missile, the AUM-2 Petrel. This offered greater range, but then required its own guidance too. The choice was made, early on, that this would be one of the newly developed jet engines rather than the simpler rocket motors used by the British – the Fairchild J44 engine finally chosen did not run until 1948. Once WWII was over, the need for the weapon was less urgent and development slowed.

Kingfisher began as a range extender for attacks against surface ships, although it was questioned whether these lighter torpedoes would be adequately effective against those targets. It was also realized that the main threat at this time was from submarines, not surface ships, and Kingfisher's stand-off design was useful here too. As the British had discovered with Hedgehog and Squid, a flying weapon could arrive on the position of a detected target much faster than a torpedo could, so not allowing it time to evade or escape. The acoustic homing which had been needed to make the torpedoes self-targeting against a large target could also be developed to make them into submarine hunters. For the Mark 21, this 'feature creep' seems to have caused more delay than progress - attempting to improve their homing adequately caused the Mod 0 project to be abandoned. Submarines only required a small warhead to damage them and so the lighter Mark 35 torpedo became the favored design for an all-purpose air-launchable torpedo. This, in turn, was simplified as the air-launch-only Mark 41 torpedo, which became the payload for the AUM-N-2 Petrel in service through the mid-1950s.

Development of this torpedo was discontinued and it was not used in service to any extent.

See also
 Mark 21 Mod 0 torpedo, a similar but less successful project, with homing developed by Westinghouse, and using an electric motor.
 Mark 35 torpedo, a multi-role torpedo, also considered with the SUM-N-2 Grebe rocket as part of the surface-launched 'Kingfisher E' concept
 Mark 43 torpedo (1951), the first successful US air-launched ASW torpedo in service

References

Torpedoes
Torpedoes of the United States
Unmanned underwater vehicles